Asbury is an unincorporated community in Stokes County, North Carolina, United States.

Asbury is a rural community about 10 miles north of Pilot Mountain and 11 miles east of Mount Airy, 1.5 miles south of the Virginia border.

See also
 Asbury, North Carolina (disambiguation)

Unincorporated communities in Stokes County, North Carolina
Unincorporated communities in North Carolina